Thiruvananthapuram International Airport , is an international airport which serves Thiruvananthapuram, the capital city of Kerala, India. Established in 1932, it is the first airport in the state of Kerala and fifth international airport of India, officially declared in 1991. It is the operating base of Air India, Air India Express, IndiGo and SpiceJet. It shares a visible proximity to Shankumugham Beach making it the nearest airport to a sea in India, just about 0.6 miles (approx. 1 km) away from the sea.

The airport is the eighth busiest airport in India in terms of international traffic and the twenty second–busiest overall. In fiscal year 2018–19, the airport handled more than 4.4 million passengers with a total of 33,093 aircraft movements.

In addition to civil operations, the airport headquarters the Southern Air Command (India) of the Indian Air Force (IAF) and the Indian Coast Guard for their operations. IAF have an exclusive apron to handle all their operations. Thiruvananthapuram Airport also caters to the Rajiv Gandhi Academy for Aviation Technology which carries out pilot training activities. The airport hosts Air India's Narrow body Maintenance, repair and overhaul unit – MRO consisting of twin hangars for servicing Boeing 737 type aircraft, servicing mostly Air India Express aircraft.

History
The airport was established in 1932 as part of the Royal Flying Club under the initiative of Lt. Col. Raja Goda Varman, husband of Karthika Thirunal Lakshmi Bayi, the Rani of Attingal and of Travancore Kingdom. Raja Goda Varman, a trained pilot, felt the need of an airport to accommodate Travancore in the aviation map of India and requested the Travancore Durbar to initiate the process for establishing an aerodrome. A detailed report was made and presented to the King by Consort Prince in this regard. It may be mentioned that the King was the brother of Lt. Col. Raja's wife, and the colonel's own children were the heirs to the throne.

In 1935, on royal patronage of Maharaja Chithira Thirunal, Tata Airlines made its maiden flight to the airport using DH.83 Fox Moth aircraft under command of India's first pilot Nevill Vintcent carrying Jamshed Navoroji, a Tata company official, and Kanchi Dwarakadas, commercial agent of Travancore in Karachi, with a special mail from the Viceroy of British India, Lord Willingdon, wishing birthday greetings to the Maharaja.

The first flight took off on 1 November 1935, carrying mails of Royal Anchal (Travancore Post) to Bombay. In 1938, the Royal Government of Travancore acquired a Dakota as Maharaja's private aircraft and placed the first squadron of Royal Indian Air Force (Travancore) for protection of the state from aerial attacks. After Independence, the airstrip was used for domestic flights with the construction of a new domestic terminal, Terminal 1.

International operations were initiated by Air India to cities in the Arabian Peninsula in the late 1970s using Boeing 707. By early 80s, the then Indian Airlines started service to Colombo, followed by service to Male. Later, SriLankan Airlines (then Air Lanka) and Air Maldives (now Maldivian) started operations. Followed by Indian Airlines, that started a service to Sharjah. On 1 January 1991, TIA was upgraded to an international airport, making it the fifth international airport of India after Delhi, Bombay, Madras and Calcutta.

On 1 March 2011, the first flight operated from the new international terminal, Terminal 2. IX 536 (Air India Express) from Sharjah marked the first arrival. Air India Express operated the first departure to Dubai from this new terminal. IndianOil Skytanking is the company which introduced single man refuelling in India and started refuelling operations at Trivandrum in March 2016.

This was the main hub for the defunct Kairali Airlines from 9 January 2013 to 2017.

In November 2018, the Central Government cleared a proposal by the Airports Authority of India (AAI) for leasing out six of its airports, including Trivandrum. The following month, AAI commenced an international competitive bidding process to award Operations, Management and Development (OMD) contracts for the six airports.
The Adani Group, GMR Group and Kerala State Industrial Development Corporation (KSIDC) participated in the bidding process which was won by the Adani Group.

Since some public interest litigations were filed with respect to the bidding process for the airport, the Union Cabinet give its approval for awarding the airport to Adani subject to the outcome of Writ Petition. Accordingly, AAI signed a letter of agreement with Adani in September 2020.
Adani Thiruvananthapuram International Airport Limited (ATIAL), floated by the Adani Group to run the airport, would operate, manage and develop the airport for a period of fifty years.
As per the agreement, ATIAL would get control of the airport only after a concession agreement was executed and the performance bank guarantee was paid and subject to clearance of legal hurdles.

Facilities

Runway

Thiruvananthapuram International Airport has a single -long runway, equipped to operate any type of aircraft. It has a -long parallel taxiway.

Terminal

There are two terminals. Terminal 1 is for domestic flights (except Air India), and Terminal 2 is for all international flights as well as all domestic flights of Air India.

The international terminal ground operations are handled by Air India SATS Airport Services Pvt. Ltd. It is fully air-conditioned with WiFi facility. The terminal features spacious lounges, natural lighting with extensive use of glass roofing and better conveyance facilities for passengers. It has three baggage carousels and elaborate immigration/customs facilities. Flemingo, India's first privately owned duty-free operator is managing the duty-free shop at the international terminal.

The domestic terminal has basic amenities including cafés, a beer and wine bar, a book-seller, free local calls, Specialized baby care room and phone-recharging points. Into Plane Services fuelling operations handled by IndianOil Skytanking.

Terminal 1 (Domestic)
The domestic terminal was the first terminal of the airport inaugurated by Chief minister of Kerala EK Nayanar in 1992. The terminal has two Aerobridges and two remote gates. All airlines except Air India are served by the domestic terminal.

Terminal 2 (International)
The newly built Terminal 2 has three additional jetways and parking bays to accommodate 8 aircraft. The terminal is built opposite to the current terminal across the runway and is closer to the city side. The terminal, constructed by the AAI and designed by the UK firm, Pascall+Watson architects, is expected to provide impetus to the development of the IT sector and the tourism industry in the southern districts of Kerala.

It is able to handle the passengers of three Airbus A340s and one Boeing 747 aircraft simultaneously (roughly 1500 passengers). The annual handling capacity of the terminal will be 1.8 million.

To enable the passengers to check in at any counter, a Common Users Terminal Equipment (CUTE) is installed. X-ray machines are attached to the side of the conveyor belts for faster clearance of baggage.

The entrance to the terminal is from the Chacka-Eenchakkal road. A bridge has been built across the Parvathy Puthanar canal to link the new terminal to the Kazhakuttam-Inchivila NH (National Highway) 47 bypass. The new terminal has a car park area that can accommodate about 600 cars.

There is a pre paid taxi service counter and foreign exchange (Thomas Cook India) counter in the arrivals area.

Thiruvananthapuram Airport was included in Ministry of civil aviation strategic plan for 2010–2015 to upgrade as Category-A airport by developing to aerodrome CODE 4E/4F, construct parallel runway with taxiways alongside both runways and so forth.

Air traffic control
The airport has a CAT-1 instrument landing system (ILS), DVOR and distance measuring equipment (DME). The airport is also equipped with a Mono-pulse Secondary Surveillance Radar, Air Route Surveillance Radar and an Airport Surveillance Radar which allows approach and area control of the airspace around the airport and nearby air routes.

MRO facility
Thiruvananthapuram International Airport hosts Air India's Narrow body Maintenance, repair and overhaul unit—MRO consisting of twin hangars for servicing Boeing 737 type aircraft, servicing mostly Air India Express aircraft. The maintenance of two aircraft can be simultaneously done at the two hangars present at the MRO. The Maintenance, Repair, and Overhaul (MRO) facility of Air India Charters Limited (AICL) at Thiruvananthapuram International Airport was given permission to carry out the crucial ‘C’ checks of their Boeing 737-800 fleet.

Other operations
In addition to civil operations, Thiruvananthapuram Airport also caters to IAF and Coast Guard for their strategical operations and Airforce NCC Cadets' Trg . IAF have an exclusive apron to handle all their operations. Thiruvananthapuram Airport also caters for Rajiv Gandhi Academy for Aviation Technology. The academy has its own hangar facility at the airport. The hangar facility can accommodate 10 trainer aircraft.

Expansion
Further expansion of the airport has been planned with the AAI demanding 82 acres for the demolition of the existing domestic terminal and the construction of a newer one and other related facilities for Thiruvananthapuram Airport. The state government has agreed to acquire 18 acres for the construction of the domestic terminal. The AAI is planning to construct a new terminal of around 40,000 square metres, which would spruce up the city airport's total terminal area to 75,000-square-metres. Paper works, including drawing of plans, for the new terminal building have already begun at the AAI headquarters. The plan is to complete the construction of the new terminal within 18 to 24 months after the state government hands over the land to the Airport Authority of India. The elevation of new terminal would be identical to the existing Terminal 2.

Airlines and destinations

Passenger

Cargo
The following cargo airlines fly to the airport:

 Gulf Air Falcon Cargo
 SpiceXpress

Statistics

Security
Thiruvananthapuram International Airport is listed among the major airports of India. Its safety and security are handled by the Bureau of Civil Aviation Security through the Central Industrial Security Force#Airport security (CISF). In the past, the airport security was under the control of airport police (under the state government). However, following the hijacking of Indian Airlines Flight 814 in 1999, the airport security was handed over to CISF. Thiruvananthapuram Airport also has advanced security equipment including X-RAY Baggage inspection (X-BIS), Explosive Trace Detection System (ETDS) and provision of an In-Line Baggage Screening system; at the NITB, state-of-the-art Closed Circuit Television (CCTV), Flight information Display System (fids) and Public Address (PA) systems, as well as an Interactive Voice Response System (IVRS) for flight information, are there for passengers' convenience.

In-Line Baggage Screening system (ILBS) was installed at Terminal 2 on 21 July 2020.

See also
 Airports in India
 List of busiest airports in India by passenger traffic
 Cochin International Airport
 Calicut International Airport
 Kannur International Airport
 Sabarimala Greenfield Airport

References

External links

 Thiruvananthapuram International Airport at the Airports Authority of India

1932 establishments in India
Airports in Kerala
International airports in India
Airports established in 1932
Buildings and structures in Thiruvananthapuram
Transport in Thiruvananthapuram
20th-century architecture in India